The Kaleidoscope Pavilion was a sponsored pavilion at Expo 67, the International World's Fair held in Montreal, Quebec,  Canada in 1967.

Theme
Designed to reflect a color-based theme, the pavilion acted as an oversized, three-dimensional color wheel. Built in the shape of a carousel, it featured 112 colored fins that created the illusion the structure was moving as spectators moved across the Expo grounds. The interior of the pavilion consisted of a 12-minute film titled Man and Color that was projected on oversized screens. Shown over the course of three differently designed rooms, mirrors were used to create an abstract, reflection-driven experience of color. Music for the exhibit was composed by R. Murray Schafer.

Creators
Sponsored by six Canadian chemical companies, the pavilion was designed by members of the University of Waterloo’s Institute of Design and Morley Markson and Associates, a Toronto-based industrial design firm. The project director was University of Waterloo professor Vir Handa.

References

Expo 67
World's fair architecture in Montreal